Naomi Bentley (born 1981) is an English actress known for her roles in White Van Man, Primeval, Grownups, Dalziel and Pascoe and Casanova.

Acting career
Bentley graduated from a three-year acting course at the Webber Douglas Academy of Dramatic Art in 2004 and has since been in demand for film, theatre and TV roles.

She made her 2004 TV debut in an episode of Holby City, followed by an appearance in Blue Murder, in which she played a receptionist. Other early appearances included a leading role in the drama Burn at the National Theatre, playing Martha in Martha Loves Michael at the Edinburgh Fringe and the role of Leah in Beautiful Thing at the Sound Theatre.

Bentley's other TV and film roles since 2004 have included WPC Maria Jackson in Dalziel and Pascoe, Leonilda in Casanova, Rachel in Grownups and Shelley in the Channel 4 film The Mark of Cain.  The second series of Primeval, in which Bentley played a leading role, was shown on ITV in March and April 2008.

She starred in new BBC One comedy drama Mutual Friends alongside Marc Warren, Keeley Hawes, Sarah Alexander and Alexander Armstrong. She also played medical student Holly Farr in Silent Witness in 2008.

She appeared as Mina in the Jonathan Creek 2009 Christmas Special. She appeared alongside Joel Fry in both the BBC3 comedy series White Van Man and ITV2 comedy series Plebs. In January 2013 she played Rose in Miranda and also in 2013 she appeared in the ITV1 comedy drama series Great Night Out as Colleen.

Filmography

References

External links

1982 births
Alumni of the Webber Douglas Academy of Dramatic Art
English film actresses
English stage actresses
English television actresses
21st-century English actresses
Living people